Hisonotus taimensis is a species of catfish in the family Loricariidae. It is native to South America, where it occurs in the Lagoon Mirim drainage. The species reaches 6.6 cm (2.6 inches) SL.

References 

Otothyrinae
Fish described in 1981